The Sakonnet River Bridge is a four-lane bridge spanning the Sakonnet River in eastern Rhode Island. The bridge carries RI 24 and RI 138 between the communities of Portsmouth and Tiverton, Rhode Island. The current bridge is a box girder bridge that opened in 2012 at a cost of $120 million (USD). The previous bridge was a truss bridge that was built in 1956 and demolished in 2012 due to structural deficiencies.

It became part of RI 24 during the 1960s after the completion of the Portsmouth and Tiverton Expressways.  At one point, it was briefly considered for inclusion as part of the never-built Interstate 895.

Tolls
In 2003, state officials declared there would be no tolls on the bridge. In 2012, governor Lincoln Chafee reversed this decision.

In August 2013 after the opening of the new bridge, the Rhode Island Turnpike and Bridge Authority began collecting a 10-cent toll from drivers with an E-ZPass transponder using an open road tolling gantry. Those without E-ZPass were expected to call the Authority's office to arrange payment. The toll was imposed in order to keep open the future possibility of higher tolls due to a quirk in federal law. From August 2013 to May 2014, the Rhode Island Turnpike and Bridge Authority collected a total of $677,570.

The toll was removed in June 2014 and the Rhode Island Department of Transportation stated in 2019 that they would not impose any tolls on the bridge in the future. After the toll was removed, opponents asked for a refund of the collected tolls, and that all tolling equipment be dismantled.

References

External links 

 Web site containing engineering impact documents for the replacement of the Sakonnet River Bridge.
 Web site for Rhode Island Turnpike and Bridge Authority Sakonnet River Bridge Decorative Lighting requests.

Road bridges in Rhode Island
Bridges in Newport County, Rhode Island
Narragansett Bay
Box girder bridges in the United States
Truss bridges in the United States
Buildings and structures in Portsmouth, Rhode Island
Buildings and structures in Tiverton, Rhode Island
Bridges completed in 1956
1956 establishments in Rhode Island
Former toll bridges in Rhode Island
Bridges completed in 2012
2012 establishments in Rhode Island